Moniquirá is a town and municipality in Boyacá Department, Colombia, part of the subregion of the Ricaurte Province. It is known for its "bocadillos" and "panelitas de leche" (both little sweet cakes). Moniquirá borders San José de Pare in the north, Togüí and Arcabuco in the east, Gachantivá and Santa Sofia in the south and in the west with the department of Santander.

Etymology 
In the Chibcha language of the Muisca, Moniquirá means "place of bath".

History 
Before the arrival of the Spanish conquistadores, Moniquirá was who were ruled by the cacique of Susa, part of the Muisca Confederation. Gonzalo Jiménez de Quesada passed through Ubaza, part of Moniquirá on March 16, 1537.

Economy 
Main economical activity of Moniquirá is agriculture; coffee, sugar cane and maize. The bocadillos industry provides employment for over 800 people.

Gallery

References 

Municipalities of Boyacá Department
Populated places established in 1825
Muisca Confederation
Muysccubun